Seven's Travels is the third studio album by the Minneapolis hip hop group Atmosphere, their first and only for Epitaph. It was released on September 23, 2003. "Trying to Find a Balance" and "National Disgrace" were released as singles and music videos were made for both.

Background 
The original cover features a naked, bare-breasted woman laying in a field. It was changed to a plain white cover resembling The White Album due to the death of Marissa Mathy-Zvaifler, a 16-year-old girl who was murdered by a janitor during an Atmosphere show in Albuquerque, NM on July 16, 2003. The janitor, convicted child sex offender Dominic Akers, had led the girl backstage, claiming he would allow her to meet vocalist Sean Daley (aka Slug). Slug dedicates the album to Zvaifler in the liner notes, and later wrote about the incident and his reaction in a song entitled "That Night, which appears on the 2005 album You Can't Imagine How Much Fun We're Having. Slug would later describe the song as one he 'wasn't supposed to write' and marks the 2005 album as a whole as a beginning point of Slug's more positive storytelling in his music.

Release 
On December 10, 2013, 3,000 limited edition vinyl pressings were released in celebration of the album's tenth anniversary. It uses the album's original cover art and contains bonus tracks.

Track listing 
All songs are produced by Ant.

Personnel
Slug  –  vocals
Nate "the Guitar Man" Collis  –  additional guitar on "Trying to Find a Balance" and "Always Coming Back Home to You"
Cameron H., Kristin B., and Nate the Merchant –  additional vocals on "Bird Sings Why the Caged I Know"
Tasha Baron – additional rhodes on "Gotta Lotta Walls" and "Good Times (Sick Pimpin')"
Anthony D. –  additional vocals on "Gotta Lotta Walls"
Sara, Katie and others –  additional vocals on "Suicidegirls"
Jason Cook –  additional vocals on "Jason"
Brother Ali –  guest vocals on "Cats Van Bags"
Sara Lindsay, Sage Francis  –  additional vocals on "Lifter Puller"
Nate Collis –  additional jawharp on "Shoes" and "National Disgrace"
Crescent Moon and Advizor –  additional vocals on "Liquor Lyles Cool July"
I Self Devine –  additional vocals on "In My Continental"

References

External links
Rhymesayers Entertainment

Atmosphere (music group) albums
2003 albums
Epitaph Records albums
Rhymesayers Entertainment albums